Greenup may refer to:

People
Greenup (surname)

Places
Greenup, Illinois, a village in Cumberland County
Greenup, Kentucky, a city in Greenup County
Greenup County, Kentucky

See also
Green Up Day